Onciul is a Romanian surname. Notable people with the surname include:

Aurel Onciul (1864–1921), Romanian political leader
Dimitrie Onciul (1856–1923), Romanian historian

Romanian-language surnames